Greater Taung Local Municipality is a local municipality in Dr Ruth Segomotsi Mompati District Municipality, North West Province, South Africa. The Seat of local municipality is Taung.

Main places
The 2001 census divided the municipality into the following main places:

Politics 

The municipal council consists of forty-eight members elected by mixed-member proportional representation. Twenty-four councillors are elected by first-past-the-post voting in twenty-four wards, while the remaining twenty-four are chosen from party lists so that the total number of party representatives is proportional to the number of votes received. In the election of 1 November 2021 the African National Congress (ANC) won a majority of twenty-eight seats on the council.
The following table shows the results of the election.

References

External links
 Official site

Local municipalities of the Dr Ruth Segomotsi Mompati District Municipality